Jack Cockburn (26 December 1911 -  21 September 1990) was an Australian rules footballer who played for Essendon in the Victorian Football League (VFL) and for South Adelaide in the South Australian National Football League (SANFL).

Cockburn started his SANFL career with South Adelaide in 1934, having previously played for Blyth as a teenager and young man in the Stanley Football Association, where he won the A. E. Fryar Medal a record three times. He was a member of South Adelaide premiership teams in 1935 and 1938. The 1935 season also saw him win a Magarey Medal for the league's best and fairest player. By the time he retired in 1947 he had played 167 SANFL games and represented South Australia seven times at interstate football. He is a half back flanker in South Adelaide's official 'Team of the Century' and was inducted into the South Australian Football Hall of Fame in 2003.

During World War II he was stationed in Melbourne and in 1943 was signed up by Essendon. He played in Essendon's five point Grand Final loss to Richmond that year. After playing for Essendon again in 1944 he transferred to Williamstown in the VFA and was ruck-rover in the 1945 premiership side, playing 15 games and kicking 8 goals in his sole season with the Seagulls. Cockburn returned to South Australia in 1946.

Cockburn's daughter, Bronte Cockburn, played basketball for Australia women's national basketball team at the 1957 World Championship held in Brazil.

References

External links

Essendon Football Club players
South Adelaide Football Club players
Magarey Medal winners
Australian rules footballers from South Australia
Jack
South Australian Football Hall of Fame inductees
1911 births
1990 deaths